Birch Beach may refer to the following places in the United States:

 Birch Beach, Michigan
 Birch Beach, Minnesota